Calophasia barthae is a moth of the family Noctuidae. The species was first described by Wagner in 1929. It is found in the southern part of the Balkans, Turkey and the Middle East.

Adults are on wing in March. There is one generation per year.

External links

Cuculliinae
Moths of Europe
Moths of Asia
Moths of the Middle East
Moths described in 1929